Jordan participated in the 15th Asian Games, officially known as the XV Asiad held in Doha, Qatar from December 1 to December 15, 2006. Jordan ranked 25th with a lone gold medal and 3 silver medals in this edition of the Asiad.

Medalists

References

Nations at the 2006 Asian Games
2006
Asian Games